Jagatpur is a village in Delhi, India. Jagatpur is one of 122 villages of Delhi, situated on the cities outskirts. The Yamuna River surrounds the village, sometimes causing floods.

Background 

There have been a number of recurrent floods in the history of this community that has led to resettlement and rehabilitation of the population. The village is rural in its socio-cultural aspects but because of its vicinity to NCT Delhi, it resembles a semi-urban community.

One of the prominent features of the Gujjar community is that they traditionally rear cattle. Cattle rearing has been the backbone of the village economy in the past. The village has undergone many geographical, economic, cultural and social changes. Due to the increasing value of landholdings, the people of Jagatpur have started abandoning their traditional practice of cattle rearing in favor of alternatives better suited to the fast pace of economic growth.  However, there is still a very significant population involved in cattle rearing, especially relative to Delhi.

Governance
The community has a local Caste Panchayat. The representatives of the Panchayat are heads of the 26 Kunbas of the village. The community is inhabited primarily by Gujjars, who constitute about 85% of the village population. The remaining population is composed of all the other Hindu castes, as well as a small Muslim community. Gujjars are the dominant caste with the rest of the population being composed of migrants from Uttar Pradesh & Bihar.

Population
The population of Jagatpur is approximately 15,000 and is part of the Jharoda ward and Burari constituency. The village is secluded - it is characteristically rural and geographically isolated. The Jharoda ward has a population of 2.5 lakh, whereas the whole Jagatpur village has 15,000 (approx.) people, which makes the community politically vulnerable. There are mainly two societies formed by the villagers.
 Bawa Singh Johai Memorial Trust
 Lok Sewa Samiti

Institutions
There is no Anganwadi within Jagatpur village, but there is one Anganwadi in the Jagatpur Extension area.
Primary Health Center (PHC) - There is only one PHC [SPUHC Jagatpur (80)] in Jagatpur Extension but none in the Jagatpur village. This PHC runs inside a rented accommodation and lacks proper infrastructure.

Sports
Sports are the primary entertainment and with the help of non-residents, two Kabaddi Tournaments are organized every year to  youngsters to participate in sports. In addition, dog race competitions and ox race competitions are also held annually. Kabaddi is one of the oldest games played here and a talented number of Kabaddi players are present in the village. While efforts have been made to encourage an interest in traditional games, some youngsters still prefer Cricket and other popular sports.

References

External links
Maps of India

Villages in Central Delhi district